Cher van Slobbe (born 10 September 1995) is a Dutch cricketer. She played for the Netherlands women's national cricket team in the 2015 ICC Women's World Twenty20 Qualifier in November 2015.

In June 2018, she was named in the Netherlands' squad for the 2018 ICC Women's World Twenty20 Qualifier tournament. She made her Women's Twenty20 International (WT20I) for the Netherlands against United Arab Emirates in the World Twenty20 Qualifier on 7 July 2018. She was the leading wicket-taker for the Netherlands in the tournament, with five dismissals in five matches.

References

External links
 

1995 births
Living people
Dutch women cricketers
Netherlands women Twenty20 International cricketers
Place of birth missing (living people)
20th-century Dutch women
20th-century Dutch people
21st-century Dutch women